Burabay (Burabai kölı, Borovoye) is a prominent lake of the Kokshetau Lakes, a group of lakes in northern Kazakhstan, located in the Burabay District of Akmola Region, in the eastern part of the Kokshetau Hills.

The name of the lake originates from the word bor, which means "pine forest". The historical name is Auliekol, which means "holy lake".

Geography
The lake is separated from nearby lake Ulken Shabakty to the north by a narrow strip of land.
The shores of the lake are overgrown with pine forest. 
The water in the lake is limpid and the bottom can be seen clearly. The water surface of the lake is almost open, only the western and northwestern shores are rushy; the southern shores are rocky, and the eastern shores are sandy. The bottom is flat.

The lake has several capes. Burabay is separated by mountain ranges from the closest lakes. The cliffs and capes of the northwestern and southern coasts create a unique landscape.

The lake water is healing. On the eastern shore, there is the Burabay spa town and the Nature Museum (Kazakh: Табиғат мұражайы). The surrounding area is situated within the Burabay National Park.

In literature 

The Kazakh writer Zhanaidar Musin, in his book «Жер шоктыгы Кокшетау» (Almaty, 1989), called Lake Burabay "Kumuskol", which means "silver lake". The nature of Burabay is proclaimed in Saken Seifulin’s poem “Kokshetau”:

Burabay water’s more limpid than dew
One cannot withhold admiration its view.
Its shore’s overgrown with glorious trees
Magnificent pines, white birches make scenery splendid indeed.

References 

Burabay
Kazakh Uplands